The 1895 Birthday Honours were appointments by Queen Victoria to various orders and honours to reward and highlight good works by citizens of the British Empire. The appointments were made to celebrate the official birthday of The Queen, and were published in The Times on 25 May 1895 and in The London Gazette on 25 May 1895 and on 11 June 1895.  

The recipients of honours are displayed here as they were styled before their new honour, and arranged by honour, with classes (Knight, Knight Grand Cross, etc.) and then divisions (Military, Civil, etc.) as appropriate.

United Kingdom and British Empire

Privy Councillor
The Queen appointed the following to Her Majesty's Most Honourable Privy Council:
William Leigh, 2nd Baron Leigh
Sir Henry Brougham Loch

Baronetcies
John Tomlinson Brunner 
David Dale, of Darlington.
William Dunn 
John Watson, of Earnock, Lanarkshire.

Knight Bachelor
Walter Besant. 
William Conway.
Dr. Joseph Ewart, of Brighton.
Dr. Christopher Furness 
Nicholas John Hannen, Consul-General at Shanghai, and Judge of the Supreme Court for China and Japan.
Henry Hicks Hocking, Attorney General of Jamaica.
Henry Irving.
William Wollaston Karslake 
William Hales Hingston  of Montreal.
Joseph Francis Leese  Recorder of Manchester.
George Charles Mason.
Lewis Morris.
Alexander Campbell Onslow, Chief Justice of tho Colony of Western Australia.
Robert Pullar.
Dr William Howard Russell.
Arthur Snowden, Mayor of the City of Melbourne.

The Most Honourable Order of the Bath

Knight Grand Cross of the Order of the Bath (GCB)
Military Division

General Sir Michael Anthony Shrapnel Biddulph  Colonel-Commandant, Royal Artillery. 
General Sir Charles John Stanley Gough  Indian Army. 
Admiral Sir William Montagu Dowell 
General Sir George Harry Smith Willis  Colonel the Devonshire Regiment. 
Lieutenant-General Sir Drury Curzon Drury-Lowe  Colonel 17th Lancers. 
Admiral of the Fleet, Richard Meade, Earl of Clanwilliam 
Admiral Sir Richard Vesey Hamilton 

Civil Division
The Rt. Hon. the Lord Playfair 
The Rt. Hon. James Stansfeld.

Knight Commander of the Order of the Bath (KCB)
Military Division

Vice-Admiral Charles Frederick Hotham 
Vice-Admiral Robert O'Brien FitzRoy 
Lieutenant-General Henry Brasnell Tuson  Royal Marine Artillery. 
James Nicholas Dick  Inspector-General of Hospitals and Fleets, and Director-General of the Medical Department of the Navy. 

Civil Division
Ralph Henry Knox  Accountant-General of the Army.
Stair Agnew  Registrar-General and Deputy Keeper of Records, Scotland.
Lieutenant-Colonel Arthur John Bigge  Private Secretary to the Queen.
Nicholas Roderick O'Conor  Envoy Extraordinary and Minister Plenipotentiary at Peking.
Sir David Harrel  Under Secretary for Ireland.
Edward Maunde Thompson  Principal Librarian and Secretary, British Museum.

Honorary
Honorary Lieutenant-Colonel Raja Ram Singh, C.B. (Honorary), Commander-in-Chief, Kashmir State Troops.

Companion of the Order of the Bath (CB)
Military Division
Alfred Douglas Adrian, Assistant-Secretary, Local Government Board.
Honorary Colonel the Hon. Henry William John Byng, Equerry to the Queen.
Edward Fairfield  Assistant Under Secretary of State, Colonial Office.
Lieutenant-Colonel Arthur Ford, late Royal Artillery, Inspector of Explosives, Home Office.
Ralph Milbanke, Secretary of Embassy, Diplomatic Service.
Richard Edward Sprague Oram, Chief Inspector, Factory Department, Home Office.
Robert Barrett Stokes, late Capt., 16th Regiment of Foot, Divisional Commissioner, Ireland (Cork Division).
John Taylor, Surveyor, Office of Works.
Major Francis Reginald Wingate  Royal Artillery.

Civil Division
Rear-Admiral William James Lloyd Wharton, Hydrographer of the Navy. 
Albert John Durston, Engineer-in-Chief of the Navy. 
Major Henry Pilkington, retired pay, late Royal Engineers, Director of Engineering and Architectural Works, Admiralty.
Lieutenant Lawrence Hugh Crawford, Royal Naval Reserve.

The Most Exalted Order of the Star of India

Knight Grand Commander (GCSI)
His Highness the Maharaja Scindia of Gwalior. 
The Rt. Hon. George Robert Canning, Baron Harris

Knight Commander (KCSI)
Lieutenant-General Sir William Stephen Alexander Lockhart

Companion (CSI)
Alan Caddell, Indian Civil Service. 
Sir Alexander Edward Miller  Member of the Council of the Governor-General. 
Charles Montgomery Rivaz, Indian Civil Service. 
Arthur Forbes, Indian Civil Service. 
Kerala Varma Valiya Koil Thampuran.

The Most Distinguished Order of Saint Michael and Saint George

Knight Grand Cross of the Order of St Michael and St George (GCMG)
The Rt. Hon. John Hamilton-Gordon, the Earl of Aberdeen  Governor-General of the Dominion of Canada.
Lieutenant-Colonel Sir Charles Bullen Hugh Mitchell  Governor and Commander-in-Chief of the Straits Settlements and their Dependencies.

Knight Commander of the Order of St Michael and St George (KCMG)
Sir Thomas Fowell Buxton  on appointment as Governor and Commander-in-Chief of the Colony of South Australia. 
The Hon. Sir Joseph Palmer Abbott  Speaker of the Legislative Assembly of the Colony of New South Wales. 
The Hon. Richard Chaffey Baker  President of the Legislative Council of the Colony of South Australia. 
Colonel Richard Edward Rowley Martin  British Representative on the late Provisional Government Committee in Swaziland. 
Ernest Mason Satow, Ksq., C.M.G., Her Majesty's Envoy Extraordinary and Minister Plenipotentiary at Tangier.
John Christian Schultz  late Lieutenant-Governor of the Province of Manitoba, in the Dominion of Canada. 
Henri-Gustave Joly de Lotbinière, formerly Premier of the Province of Quebec, in the Dominion of Canada. 
The Hon. William Austin Zeal, President of the Legislative Council of the Colony of Victoria.

Companion of the Order of St Michael and St George (CMG)
Leopold Marquard, late Surveyor-General of the Colony of the Cape of Good Hope. 
Charles Boughton Hamilton, Receiver-General of the Colony of British Guiana. 
Archibald Jones Pile, Speaker of the House of Assembly of the Island of Barbados. 
Ernest Bickham Sweet-Escott, Colonial Secretary of the Colony of British Honduras. 
William Wilson Mitchell, Unofficial Member of the Legislative Council of the Island of Ceylon. 
Henrique Charles Shepstone, late Secretary for Native Affairs in the Colony of Natal. 
Joseph Anderson Panton, Police Magistrate in the city of Melbourne, in the Colony of Victoria. 
Francis Henry May, Captain Superintendent of Police in the Colony of Hong Kong. 
Alexander Roland Milne, Collector of Customs at the Port of Victoria, British Columbia, for services in connection with the Bering Sea negotiations. 
Salvatore Luigi Pisani  Chief Medical Officer in the Island of Malta. 
Joseph Sylvester O'Halloran, Secretary to the Royal Colonial Institute.
George Greville, Secretary to Her Majesty's Legation at Rio de Janeiro.
Raphael Borg, Her Majesty's Consul at Cairo.

The Most Eminent Order of the Indian Empire

Knight Commander (KCIE)
Henry Ravenshaw Thuillier
William Robert Brooke  late Director-General of Telegraphs in India
Maharaja Pratap Narayan Singh of Ayudhya
Maharaja Ravaneshwar Prasad Singh, Bahadur of Gidhaur
Sirdar Krishna Rao Bapu Saheb Jadu

Companion (CIE)
Gangadhar Rao Madhav Chitnavis
Rao Bahadur Bashyam lyengar
Charles Edward Buckland, Indian Civil Service
Alexander Blackley Patterson, Indian Civil Service
Henry Arbuthnot Acworth, Indian Civil Service
Colonel Charles Arkcoll Porteous, Indian Staff Corps
Colonel Clayton Turner Lane, Indian Staff Corps
Saw Saing, the Sawbwa of Thibaw
Steyning William Edgerley, Indian Civil Service
Trichinopoly Rayalu Arakiaswamy Thumboo Chetty, Member of the Council of Regency, Mysore
Moulvi Abdul Jubbar, Khan Bahadur
Captain William Richard Yielding  Indian Staff Corps
Henry John Stanyon 
Munshi Hafiz Abdul Karim

References

Birthday Honours
1895 awards
1895 in Australia
1895 in Canada
1895 in India
1895 in the United Kingdom